The 1969 Individual Long Track European Championship was the 13th edition of the Long Track European Championship. The final was held on 3 September 1969 in Oslo, Norway.

The title was won by Don Godden of England.

Venues
1st qualifying round - Gornja Radgona, 1 June 1969
Qualifying Round 2 - Straubing, 1 June 1969
Scandinavian final - Oslo, 19 June 1969
semi-final - Scheeßel, 22 June 1969
Final - Oslo - 3 September 1969

Final Classification

References 

Sports competitions in Oslo
Motor
Motor
1960s in Oslo
International sports competitions hosted by Norway